Luciano Tesi (born 10 December 1931) is an Italian veterinarian, amateur astronomer, discoverer of many minor planets, and director of the San Marcello Pistoiese Observatory.

In 1980, he founded the "Amateur Group of Pistoiese Mountain". Later on, this resulted in the construction of the Pistoia Mountains Astronomical Observatory. As the director of the observatory, he has collaborated with many discoverers in following up near-Earth objects and in finding minor planets since 1994.

The near-Earth object and Amor asteroid, 15817 Lucianotesi, discovered by Andrea Boattini and Maura Tombelli at San Marcello Pistoiese in 1994, was named in his honor.

Discoveries 

Luciano Tesi is credited by the Minor Planet Center (MPC) with the discovery of many numbered minor planets since 1994 (see table), mostly in collaboration with several other astronomers. Together with Giancarlo Fagioli, he also discovered the main-belt asteroid 280641 Edosara, which was erroneously credited to "T. esi" by the MPC. Co-discoveries made by Tesi/Fagioli appear as 3 separate records in the MPC's List of "Minor Planet Discoverers".

List of discovered minor planets

See also

References 
 

1931 births
Discoverers of asteroids

21st-century Italian astronomers
Living people
20th-century Italian astronomers